Mohamed Nasraoui (born 18 August 2002 in Tunisia) is a Tunisian professional football player who plays as a central defender for Club Sportif Sfaxien (CSS).

References

External links

FDB Profile

 
2002 births
CS Sfaxien players
Living people
Tunisian footballers